Methoserpidine is an antihypertensive drug related to reserpine.

References

Antihypertensive agents
Benzoate esters
Monoamine-depleting agents
Phenol ethers
VMAT inhibitors